Tank Top City is the second album by Sugarsmack, released in 1998 through Sire Records.  

The album was one of many late 1990s Sire alternative rock releases that failed commercially.

Critical reception
Nashville Scene called the album "kinetic, jagged rock that lies somewhere between England’s The Fall and Atlanta’s late, lamented The Jody Grind," writing that it "finds the band in top form." The Memphis Flyer wrote that the band "has adopted an almost-over-the-top punk swagger that makes it stand out." Stereo Review called Tank Top City a "16-song luge ride through wild terrain," writing that "the secret of getting on the band's wavelength when listening to a song like 'Reagan' is to just say no to logic and submit to the band's altered neural pathways."

Track listing

Personnel 
Sugarsmack
John Adamian – drums, guitar, keyboards, vocals
Chris Chandek – guitar
Hope Nicholls – vocals, saxophone, harmonica
Aaron Pitkin – bass guitar, guitar, vocals
Production and additional personnel
Aaron Bachelder – timpani
Mindy Barker – flute
Marc Becker – production, engineering, mixing
Greg Calbi – mastering
Cookie Jackson – cello
Sarah Beth Turner – saxophone

References

External links 
 

1998 albums
Sire Records albums
Sugarsmack albums